George Plater Tayloe ( October 15, 1804 – Apr 18, 1897) was a Virginia businessman, soldier and legislator who also served as one of the original trustees of Hollins University.

Early life
George Tayloe was born October 15, 1804, at Mount Airy in Richmond County, Virginia, the ninth of fifteen children of Hon. John Tayloe III. He was born into a large aristocratic family of great wealth that had accumulated over three generations, beginning with John Tayloe I, son of the immigrant, one of the richest plantation owners and businessmen in Virginia for his generation. Considered to be the chief architect of the family fortune, he was known as the "Hon. Colonel of the Old House". The Tayloe family of Richmond County, including John Tayloe I, his son, John Tayloe II, and grandson, John Tayloe III, exemplified gentry entrepreneurship.

George Tayloe attended Princeton University. Following his graduation he moved to the western part of the state to manage a source of the family income-two iron furnaces, Catawba II and Cloverdale. These furnaces along with 1132 acres of land around Cloverdale had been purchased by the Tayloes from a Thomas Madison in 1817. George Tayloe married Mary Elizabeth Langhorne in 1830, and in 1833 he traded with his father-in-law, Colonel William Langhorne, a section of the Cloverdale property for the 598-acre Buena Vista tract.

This tract or plantation originally was known as "Roanoke" after the river which flowed at the edge of the land, but the name was changed to "Buena Vista" in 1838 when a section of lower Botetourt County became Roanoke County. Tayloe razed the Langhorne house and erected the present Greek Revival dwelling on the plantation's most commanding site. The construction date for Tayloe's house traditionally is given as 1833, the year he acquired the land, but architectural evidence indicates it is closer to 1840. In any case, the 10,783-square-foot mansion would have taken several years to build. "Buena Vista" was built of red brick said to be imported from England; the walls of the house are 18 inches thick. It barely escaped burning at the hands of General David Hunter at the time of the burning of Virginia Military Institute, but was saved from destruction by a report that General Jubal Early and his staff were there.

George Tayloe was a prominent figure in both state and local affairs. He represented Roanoke County in the state legislature, and was a signer of the Ordinance of Secession, although he originally was opposed to secession. Tayloe is remembered in the Roanoke area chiefly for his many years of support of Hollins University. His financial aid saw the school through difficult times and in 1844 he became one of the original thirteen members of the Board of Trustees. He later was made Chairman of the Board and remained
in that position until his death. Tayloe was a charter member of the Valley Union Education Society. He was also a charter member of Roanoke College. He was an avid promoter of the establishment and development of the City of Roanoke, particularly through the Buena Vista Land Company.

Four of George's sons fought as Confederate soldiers.

Later career
Tayloe was one of the three cotton planters who owned considerable estates in Arcola, Alabama, in 1860. Mr. Tayloe owned "Elmwood" (1,140 acres). He did not live there, however. He bought the place at public auction. He also owned the Walnut Grove plantation, some eight miles eastward on the Uniontown and Demopolis road.

Tayloe was a deputy from Roanoke County to the secession of Virginia in 1861, and voted against the ordinance to withdraw from the Union. In the progress of the war, however, he was Captain of a Home Guard and marched to meet a raid from the United States army. Benjamin Ogle Tayloe was incarcerated in Fort Warren by the United States government by a time pending the war upon alleged sympathies with the Confederacies. All of the grandsons of Col. John Tayloe of the revolutionary time were soldiers of the Southern Confederacy. One of the sons-in-law of Mr. George P. Tayloe was Brigadier General Thomas T. Mumford of Virginia, one of the commanders of the cavalry of the Army of Northern Virginia.

George died on April 18, 1897 in "Buena Vista", Roanoke Co., Virginia.

The Octagon

Tayloe had very close ties to Washington DC. His father built the Octagon House in 1799. The Octagon was designed by Dr. William Thornton, the first architect of the U.S. Capitol. In 1814, Colonel Tayloe offered the use of his home to President James Madison and his wife, Dolley, for a temporary "Executive Mansion" after the burning of the White House by the British. Madison used the circular room above the entrance as a study and there, on February 17, 1815, he signed the Treaty of Ghent which ended the War of 1812.

Apparitions and the presence of otherworldly forces have reportedly been seen and felt in many places at The Octagon, including on the spiral staircase, the second floor landing, the third floor landing, the third floor bedroom, and the garden area in the rear. Among the eyewitnesses have been members of the public, curators and other employees hired by the museum which owns the house.

Children

George Tayloe had ten children:

John William Tayloe CSA
Elizabeth Henrietta Tayloe
Ann Catherine Tayloe "Nannie"
Mary Lavinia Tayloe
George Edward Tayloe CSA
Rose Matilda Tayloe
James Langhorne Tayloe CSN – Killed in the Battle of Hampton Roads
Lomax Tayloe CSA
Henry Wharton Tayloe
Virginia "Jenny" Tayloe

Ancestry

References

Further reading

 Dunn, Richard S (2014). A Tale of Two Plantations : Slave Life and Labor in Jamaica and Virginia. Harvard University Press. ISBN 9780674735361  
 Kamoie, Laura Croghan (2007). Irons in the Fire : The Business History of the Tayloe Family and Virginia's Gentry, 1700-1860. Charlottesville: University of Virginia Press. ISBN 9780813926377
 Payden-Travers, Jack (1997). A Case Study of George Plater Tayloe and Buena Vista (MALS thesis). Hollins University.

1804 births
1897 deaths
American planters
Businesspeople from Virginia
People from Richmond County, Virginia
Politicians from Roanoke, Virginia
Princeton University alumni
Tayloe family of Virginia